Physics World is the membership magazine of the Institute of Physics, one of the largest physical societies in the world. It is an international monthly magazine covering all areas of physics, pure and applied, and is aimed at physicists in research, industry, physics outreach, and education worldwide.

Overview
The magazine was launched in 1988 by IOP Publishing Ltd, under the founding editorship of Philip Campbell. The magazine is sent free to members of the Institute of Physics, who can access a digital edition of the magazine; selected articles can be read by anyone for free online. It was redesigned in September 2005 and has an audited circulation of just under 35000.

The current editor is Matin Durrani. Others on the team are Michael Banks (news editor)  and Tushna Commissariat and Sarah Teah (features editors). Hamish Johnston, Margaret Harris and Tami Freeman are online editors.

Alongside the print and online magazine, Physics World produces films and two podcasts. The Physics World Stories podcast is hosted by Andrew Glester and is produced monthly. The Physics World Weekly podcast is hosted by James Dacey.

Breakthrough of the Year

The magazine makes two awards each year. These are the Physics World Breakthrough of the Year and the Physics World Book of the Year, which have both been awarded annually since 2009.

Top 10 works and winners of the Breakthrough of the Year

2009: "to August Jonathan Home and colleagues at NIST for unveiled the first small-scale device that could be described as a complete "quantum computer"
Top results from Tevatron 
Spins spotted in room-temperature silicon 
Graphane makes its debut 
Magnetic monopoles spotted in spin ices 
Water on the Moon 
Atoms teleport information over long distance 
Black-hole analogue traps sound 
Dark matter spotted in Minnesota
A 2.36 TeV big bang at the LHC 

2010: "to ALPHA and the ASACUSA group at CERN for have created new ways of controlling antiatoms of hydrogen"
Exoplanet atmosphere laid bare
Quantum effects seen in a visible object
Visible-light cloaking of large objects
Hail the first sound lasers
A Bose–Einstein condensate from light
Relativity with a human touch
Towards a Star Wars telepresence
Proton is smaller than we thought
CERN achieves landmark collisions

2011: Aephraim Steinberg and colleagues from the University of Toronto in Canada for using the technique of "weak measurement" to track the average paths of single photons passing through a Young's double-slit experiment.
Measuring the wavefunction
Cloaking in space and time
Measuring the universe using black holes
Turning darkness into light
Taking the temperature of the early universe
Catching the flavour of a neutrino oscillation
Living laser brought to life
Complete quantum computer made on a single chip
Seeing pure relics from the Big Bang

2012: "to the ATLAS and CMS collaborations at CERN for their joint discovery of a Higgs-like particle at the Large Hadron Collider".
Majorana fermions
Time-reversal violation
Galaxy-cluster motion
Peering through opaque materials
Room-temperature maser
Wiping data will cost you energy
Entangling twisted beams
Neutrino-based communication
Generating and storing energy in one step

2013: "the IceCube South Pole Neutrino Observatory for making the first observations of high-energy cosmic neutrinos".
Nuclear physics goes pear-shaped
Creating 'molecules' of light
Planck reveals 'almost perfect' universe
Quantum microscope' peers into the hydrogen atom
Quantum state endures for 39 minutes at room temperature
The first carbon-nanotube computer
B-mode polarization spotted in cosmic microwave background
The first laser-cooled Bose–Einstein condensate
Hofstadter's butterfly spotted in graphene

2014: "to the landing by the European Space Agency of the Philae (spacecraft) on 67P/Churyumov–Gerasimenko", which was the first time a probe had been landed on a comet
Quasar shines a bright light on cosmic web
Neutrinos spotted from Sun's main nuclear reaction
Laser fusion passes milestone
Electrons' magnetic interactions isolated at long last
Disorder sharpens optical-fibre images
Data stored in magnetic holograms
Lasers ignite 'supernovae' in the lab
Quantum data are compressed for the first time
Physicists sound-out acoustic tractor beam

2015: "for being the first to achieve the simultaneous quantum teleportation of two inherent properties of a fundamental particle – the photon".
Cyclotron radiation from a single electron is measured for the first time
Weyl fermions are spotted at long last
Physicists claim 'loophole-free' Bell-violation experiment
First visible light detected directly from an exoplanet
LHCb claims discovery of two pentaquarks
Hydrogen sulphide is warmest ever superconductor at 203 K
Portable 'battlefield MRI' comes out of the lab
Fermionic microscope sees first light
Silicon quantum logic gate is a first

2016: "to LIGO's gravitational wave discovery". 
Schrödinger's cat lives and dies in two boxes at once  
Elusive nuclear-clock transition spotted in thorium-229 
New gravimeter-on-a-chip is tiny yet extremely sensitive
Negative refraction of electrons spotted in graphene 
Rocky planet found in habitable zone around Sun's nearest neighbour 
Physicists take entanglement beyond identical ions 
'Radical' new microscope lens combines high resolution with large field of view 
Quantum computer simulates fundamental particle interactions for the first time
The single-atom engine that could

2017: "to First multimessenger observation of a neutron-star merger".

 Physicists create first ‘topological’ laser
 Lightning makes radioactive isotopes
 Super-resolution microscope combines Nobel-winning technologies
 Particle-free quantum communication is achieved in the lab
 Ultra-high-energy cosmic rays have extra-galactic origins
 ‘Time crystals’ built in the lab
 Metamaterial enhances natural cooling without power input
 Three-photon interference measured at long last
 Muons reveal hidden void in Egyptian pyramid

2018: "Discovery that led to the development of “twistronics”, which is a new and very promising technique for adjusting the electronic properties of graphene by rotating adjacent layers of the material."

 Multifunctional carbon fibres enable “massless” energy storage
 Compensator expands global access to advanced radiotherapy
 IPCC Special Report on 1.5 °C climate change
 EXPLORER PET/CT produces first total-body scans
 Combustion-free, propeller-free plane takes flight
 Quantum mechanics defies causal order, experiment confirms
 Activating retinal stem cells restores vision in mice
 Ancient hydrogen reveals clues to dark matter’s identity
 Superconductivity spotted in a quasicrystal

2019: "First direct observation of a black hole and its ‘shadow’" 

 Neuroprosthetic devices translate brain activity into speech
 First detection of a “Marsquake”
 CERN physicists spot symmetry violation in charm mesons
 “Little Big Coil” creates record-breaking continuous magnetic field
 Casimir effect creates “quantum trap” for tiny objects
 Antimatter quantum interferometry makes its debut
 Quantum computer outperforms conventional supercomputer
 Trapped interferometer makes a compact gravity probe
 Wearable MEG scanner used with children for the first time

2020: "Silicon-based material with a direct band gap" 

 Taking snapshots of a quantum measurement
 Quantum correlations discovered in massive mirrors
 Borexino spots solar neutrinos from elusive fusion cycle
 First observation of a ferroelectric nematic liquid crystal
 Thin-film perovskite detectors slash imaging dose
 Fundamental constants set limit on speed of sound
 Expanding twistronics to photons
 Mixed beams enhance particle therapy accuracy
 The first room-temperature superconductor

2021: "Quantum entanglement of two macroscopic objects" 

 Restoring speech in a paralysed man
 Making 30 lasers emit as one
 Quantifying wave–particle duality
 Milestone for laser fusion
 Innovative particle cooling techniques
 Observing a black hole’s magnetic field
 Achieving coherent quantum control of nuclei
 Observing Pauli blocking in ultracold fermionic gases
 Confirming the muon’s theory-defying magnetism

2022: "Changing an asteroid’s orbit " 

 Ushering in a new era for ultracold chemistry 
 Observing the tetraneutron
 Super-efficient electricity generation 
 The fastest possible optoelectronic switch 
 Opening a new window on the universe by JWST
 First-in-human FLASH proton therapy
 Perfecting light transmission and absorption
 Cubic boron arsenide is a champion semiconductor  
 Detecting an Aharonov–Bohm effect for gravity

Book of the Year

Top 10 books and the Book of the Year winner 

A blue ribbon appears against the winner.

2009: The Strangest Man: The Hidden Life of Paul Dirac, Quantum Genius by Graham Farmelo 
The Physics of Rugby –  Trevor Davis (Nottingham University Press) 
First Principles: The Crazy Business of Doing Serious Science – Howard Burton (Key Porter Books)
Oliver Heaviside: Maverick Mastermind of Electricity – Basil Mahon (Institute of Engineering and Technology) 
Atomic: The First War of Physics and the Secret History of the Atom Bomb – Jim Baggott (Icon Books) 
Lives in Science – Joseph C Hermanowicz (University of Chicago Press) 
13 Things That Don't Make Sense – Michael Brooks (Profile Books) 
Deciphering the Cosmic Number: The Strange Friendship of Wolfgang Pauli and Carl Jung – Arthur I Miller (W W Norton)
Perfect Rigor – Masha Gessen (Houghton Mifflin Harcourt)
Plastic Fantastic: How the Biggest Fraud in Physics Shook the Scientific World – Eugenie Samuel Reich (Palgrave Macmillan) 

2010: The Edge of Physics: Dispatches from the Frontiers of Cosmology by Anil Ananthaswamy 
The Tunguska Mystery – Vladimir Rubtsov (Springer) 
Coming Climate Crisis? Consider the Past, Beware the Big Fix – Claire L Parkinson (Rowman & Littlefield) 
How It Ends – Chris Impey (W W Norton) 
Lake Views: This World and the Universe – Steven Weinberg (Harvard University Press) 
The Quants: How a New Breed of Math Whizzes Conquered Wall Street and Nearly Destroyed It – Scott Patterson (Crown Business) 
Newton and the Counterfeiter –  Thomas Levenson (Faber and Faber) 
Packing for Mars –  Mary Roach (One World Publications/ W W Norton) 
Massive: The Hunt for the God Particle –  Ian Sample (Virgin Books/Basic Books) 
How to Teach Quantum Physics to Your Dog –  Chad Orzel 

2011: Quantum Man: Richard Feynman's Life in Science by Lawrence Krauss from Case Western Reserve University
Engineering Animals – Mark Denny and Alan McFadzean
Measure of the Earth: the Enlightenment Expedition that Reshaped the World – Larrie Ferreiro
The Hidden Reality: Parallel Universes and the Deep Laws of the Cosmos – Brian Greene
Lab Coats in Hollywood: Science, Scientists and Cinema – David Kirby
Quantum Man: Richard Feynman's Life in Science – Lawrence Krauss
Rising Force: the Magic of Magnetic Levitation – James Livingston
Modernist Cuisine – Nathan Myhrvold, Chris Young and Maxime Bilet
The 4% Universe: Dark Matter, Dark Energy, and the Race to Discover the Rest of Reality – Richard Panek
Radioactive: Marie and Pierre Curie, A Tale of Love and Fallout – Lauren Redniss
Hindsight and Popular Astronomy – Alan Whiting

2012: How the Hippies Saved Physics by David Kaiser from the Massachusetts Institute of Technology
A Hole at the Bottom of the Sea: The Race to Kill the BP Oil Gusher – Joel Achenbach
The Science Magpie: A Hoard of Fascinating Facts – Simon Flynn
The Idea Factory: Bell Labs and the Great Age of American Innovation – Jon Gertner
Erwin Schrödinger and the Quantum Revolution – John Gribbin
The Geek Manifesto: Why Science Matters – Mark Henderson
Life's Ratchet: How Molecular Machines Extract Order from Chaos – Peter M Hoffmann
How the Hippies Saved Physics: Science, Counterculture and the Quantum Revival – David Kaiser
How to Teach Relativity to Your Dog – Chad Orzel
Pricing the Future: Finance, Physics and the 300-Year Journey to the Black–Scholes Equation  – George Szpiro
Physics on the Fringe: Smoke Rings, Circlons, and Alternative Theories of Everything – Margaret Wertheim

2013: Physics in Mind: a Quantum View of the Brain by the biophysicist Werner Loewenstein
The Spark of Life: Electricity in the Human Body – Frances Ashcroft
The Particle at the End of the Universe: How the Hunt for the Higgs Boson Leads Us to the Edge of a New World – Sean M. Carroll
Hans Christian Ørsted: Reading Nature's Mind – Dan Charly Christensen
Churchill's Bomb: a Hidden History of Science, War and Politics – Graham Farmelo
Physics in Mind: a Quantum View of the Brain – Werner Loewenstein
J Robert Oppenheimer: A Life Inside the Center – Ray Monk
The Simpsons and their Mathematical Secrets – Simon Singh
Time Reborn: From the Crisis in Physics to the Future of the Universe – Lee Smolin
The Theoretical Minimum: What You Need to Know to Start Doing Physics – Leonard Susskind and George Hrabovsky
Weird Life: the Search for Life That Is Very, Very Different from Our Own – David Toomey

2014: Stuff Matters: The Strange Stories of the Marvellous Materials that Shape our Man-made World - Mark Miodownik
Wizards, Aliens & Starships: Physics and Math in Fantasy and Science Fiction - Charles Adler
Serving the Reich: the Struggle for the Soul of Physics Under Hitler - Philip Ball
Five Billion Years of Solitude: the Search for Life Among the Stars - Lee Billings
Plutopia: Nuclear Families, Atomic Cities, and the Great Soviet and American Plutonium Disasters - Kate Brown
Smashing Physics: Inside the World’s Biggest Experiment - Jon Butterworth
Sonic Wonderland: a Scientific Odyssey of Sound - Trevor Cox
The Perfect Theory: a Century of Geniuses and the Battle Over General Relativity - Pedro G Ferreira
Stuff Matters: the Strange Stories of the Marvellous Materials that Shape Our Man-made World - Mark Miodownik
Einstein and the Quantum: the Quest of the Valiant Swabian - Douglas Stone
Island on Fire: the Extraordinary Story of Laki, the Volcano that Turned Eighteenth-century Europe - Dark Alexandra Witze and Jeff Kanipe

2015: Trespassing on Einstein’s Lawn: a Father, a Daughter, the Meaning of Nothing and the Beginning of Everything - Amanda Gefter
Life on the Edge: the Coming of Age of Quantum Biology - Jim Al-Khalili and Johnjoe McFadden
Physics on Your Feet: Ninety Minutes of Shame but a PhD for the Rest of Your Life - Dmitry Budker and Alexander Sushkov
Half-Life: the Divided Life of Bruno Pontecorvo, Physicist or Spy - Frank Close
Beyond: Our Future in Space - Chris Impey
The Water Book: the Extraordinary Story of Our Most Ordinary Substance - Alok Jha
Monsters: the Hindenburg Disaster and the Birth of Pathological Technology - Ed Regis
Tunnel Visions: the Rise and Fall of the Superconducting Super Collider - Michael Riordan, Lillian Hoddeson, Adrienne Kolb
The Copernicus Complex: the Quest for our Cosmic (In)Significance - Caleb Scharf
Atoms Under the Floorboards: the Surprising Science Hidden in Your Home - Chris Woodford

2016:  Why String Theory? - Joseph Conlon
The Jazz of Physics: the Secret Link Between Music and the Structure of the Universe - Stephon Alexander
Storm in a Teacup: the Physics of Everyday Life - Helen Czerski
Big Science: Ernest Lawrence and the Invention that Launched the Military-Industrial Complex - Michael Hiltzik
Strange Glow: the Story of Radiation - Timothy Jorgensen
Cosmos: the Infographic Book of Space - Stuart Lowe and Chris North
Spooky Action at a Distance: the Phenomenon that Reimagines Space and Time - George Musser
Goldilocks and the Water Bears: the Search for Life in the Universe - Louisa Preston
Reality Is Not What It Seems: the Journey to Quantum Gravity - Carlo Rovelli
The Pope of Physics: Enrico Fermi and the Birth of the Atomic Age - Gino Segrè and Bettina Hoerlin

2017:  Inferior: How Science Got Women Wrong and the New Research That’s Rewriting the Story - Angela Saini
Marconi: the Man Who Networked the World by Marc Raboy
Hidden Figures: the Untold Story of the African American Women Who Helped Win the Space Race by Margot Lee Shetterly
The Glass Universe: How the Ladies of the Harvard Observatory Took the Measure of the Stars by Dava Sobel
Scale: the Universal Laws of Life and Death in Organisms, Cities and Companies by Geoffrey West
Not A Scientist: How Politicians Mistake, Misrepresent and Utterly Mangle Science by Dave Levitan
Inferior: How Science Got Women Wrong and the New Research That’s Rewriting the Story by Angela Saini
Mapping the Heavens: the Radical Scientific Ideas That Reveal the Cosmos by Priyamvada Natarajan
We Have No Idea by Jorge Cham and Daniel Whiteson
The Secret Science of Superheroes edited by Ed. Mark Lorch and Andy Miah
The Death of Expertise: the Campaign Against Established Knowledge and Why it Matters by Tom Nichols

2018:  Beyond Weird: Why Everything You Thought You Knew About Quantum Physics is Different - Philip Ball
Treknology: the Science of Star Trek from Tricorders to Warp Drives by Ethan Siegel
Ad Astra: an Illustrated Guide to Leaving the Planet by Dallas Campbell
Exact Thinking in Demented Times: the Vienna Circle and the Epic Quest for the Foundations of Science by Karl Sigmund
Beyond Weird: Why Everything You Thought You Knew About Quantum Physics is Different by Philip Ball
The Order of Time by Carlo Rovelli
Lost in Math: How Beauty Leads Physics Astray by Sabine Hossenfelder
The Dialogues: Conversations About the Nature of the Universe by Clifford V Johnson
When the Uncertainty Principle Goes to 11: Or How to Explain Quantum Physics with Heavy Metal by Philip Moriarty
What is Real: the Unfinished Quest for the Meaning of Quantum Physics by Adam Becker
Hello World: How to be Human in the Age of the Machine by Hannah Fry

2019:  The Demon in the Machine: How Hidden Webs of Information are Solving the Mystery of Life - Paul Davies
The Moon: a History for the Future by Oliver Morton
The Case Against Reality: How Evolution Hid the Truth from Our Eyes by Donald D Hoffman
Fire, Ice and Physics: the Science of Game of Thrones by Rebecca C Thompson
Underland: A Deep Time Journey by Robert Macfarlane
The Demon in the Machine: How Hidden Webs of Information are Solving the Mystery of Life by Paul Davies
The Second Kind of Impossible: the Extraordinary Quest For A New Form of Matter by Paul J Steinhardt
Superior: the Return of Race Science by Angela Saini
Einstein’s Unfinished Revolution: the Search for What Lies Beyond the Quantum by Lee Smolin
The Universe Speaks in Numbers: How Modern Maths Reveals Nature’s Deepest Secrets by Graham Farmelo
Catching Stardust: Comets, Asteroids and the Birth of the Solar System by Natalie Starkey

Pictures of the Year

Top 10 Favourite Pictures of the Year

2015:
New Horizons uncovers Pluto's icy secrets
Lasers reveal previously unseen fossil details
Clap your eyes on the first 'images' of thunder
Could lasers guide and control the path of lightning?
Gravitational lensing creates 'Einstein's cross' of distant supernova
Revealing the secret strength of a sea sponge
Satellite sensor unexpectedly detects waves in upper atmosphere
Balloon bursts approach the speed of sound
Imaging the polarity of individual chemical bonds
Organic microflowers bloom bright

References

External links

 
 

1988 establishments in the United Kingdom
Magazines established in 1988
Science and technology magazines published in the United Kingdom
Institute of Physics
Monthly magazines published in the United Kingdom
Mass media in Bristol
Physics magazines